The Ukraine student football team represents Ukraine in international student football competitions and is controlled by the FFU, the governing body for football in Ukraine, and sports section of the Ministry of Education.

History
Until fall of the Soviet Union in 1991, Ukrainian student footballers had chance to compete at Universiades as part of the Soviet Union football team. The Soviet football team debuted at the 1987 Universiades and won the tournament. It was based primarily on the Vilnuis team of FK Zalgiris (all Lithuanian team).

The Ukraine student football team debuted in 1995 in Japan. The team was mainly based on FC CSKA Kyiv (not to be confused with its other contemporary FC CSKA-Borysfen Kyiv) that was recently promoted to the 1995–96 Ukrainian Second League. The team was led by Volodymyr Lozynskyi and Volodymyr Bezsonov reached semifinal where it lost and later for the third place it also yielded to Russia student football team (based on FC KAMAZ Naberezhnye Chelny). The Ukrainian forward Pavlo Matviychenko with 5 goal tallies became the top scorer of the tournament in Japan.

In 1997 the team departed under leadership of former Soviet international footballer and Ukrainian head coach Anatoliy Konkov who had on his team such Ukrainian footballers like Anatoliy Tymoshchuk, Andriy Vorobey, Andrei Karyaka, as well as Serhiy Perkhun. The team however did not disclose its full potential by placing fourth repeating achievement of the previous Bezsonov-Lozynskyi's squad.

To the 1999 tournament the team was formed by Viktor Zhylin and was based on FC Systema-Boreks Borodianka that was managed by Zhylin at that time.

In 2001 the team led by Anatoliy Buznik won its first medals when in final game Ukraine lost to the team of Japan. The Ukraine student football team of Buznik was also helped by Ihor Yakubovskyi and consisted of following players
 Goalkeepers: Dmytro Kozachenko (Nafkom-Akademia Irpin), Vadym Zhukov (Olkom Melitopol)
 Defenders: Vasyl Hrechanyi (Podillia Khmelnytskyi), Yevhen Bredun, Oleh Shkred (both Shakhtar Donetsk), Dmytro Kondratovych (Dnipro Dnipropetrovsk), Andriy Yerokhin (Chornomorets Odesa)
 Midfielders: Vitaliy Bielikov (Dnipro Dnipropetrovsk), Serhiy Klyuchyk (Kryvbas Kryvyi Rih), Oleksandr Batrachenko, Ivan Oleksiyenko (both Metalurh Zaporizhia), Volodymyr Brayila (Metalurh Mariopol), Dmytro Bermudes (Metalist Kharkiv)
 Forwards: Oleksandr Antonenko, Ivan Kozoriz (both Systema-Boreks Borodyanka), Oleksiy Telyatnykov (Dnipro Dnipropetrovsk), Myroslav Bundash (FC Zakarpattia Uzhhorod), Yaroslav Skydan (Shakhtar Donetsk)

The winning squads of 2007 and 2009 tournaments were led by Volodymyr Lozynskyi and assisted by Ivan Shepelenko. The 2007 consisted of following players
 Goalkeepers: Volodymyr Ikonnykov (Prykarpattia Ivano-Frankivsk), Artem Shtanko (Illichivets Mariupol)
 Defenders: Andriy Zaporozhan (Enerhetyk Burshtyn), Anton Monakhov (Krymteplytsia Molodizhne), Roman Bochkur (Chornomorets Odesa), Andriy Bashlay (Dynamo Kyiv)
 Midfielders: Artem Starhorodskyi (Arsenal Kyiv), Roman Voynarovskyi (Krymteplytsia Molodizhne), Andriy Misyaylo (Illichivets Mariupol), Ihor Hordya (Dnipro Dnipropetrovsk), Dmytro Pronevych (Dnipro Cherkasy), Roman Lutsenko (MFC Mykolaiv), Mykola Revutskyi (Prykarpattia Ivano-Frankivsk), Vadym Hostiev (Podillya Khmelnytskyi), Oleh Herasymyuk (Dynamo Kyiv)
 Forwards: Ihor Khudobyak (Prykarpattia Ivano-Frankivsk), Andriy Shevchuk (PFC Sevastopol), Dmytro Hunchenko (Illichivets Mariupol)

The 2009 consisted of following players
 Goalkeepers: Yuriy Bakhtiyarov (Bukovyna Chernivtsi), Yuriy Kyslytsia (Feniks-Illichovets Kalinine)
 Defenders: Vladyslav Piskun, Andriy Bashlay (both PFC Sevastopol), Anton Monakhov (Tavriya Simferopol), Ihor Hrebynskyi (Prykarpattia Ivano-Frankivsk), Andriy Zaporozhan (PFC Oleksandriya)
 Midfielders: Oleksiy Repa, Artem Starhorodskyi (both Arsenal Kyiv), Vladyslav Mykulyak (Zakarpattia Uzhhorod), Oleksandr Krokhmalyuk (CSKA Kyiv), Ihor Hordya (Metalurh Donetsk), Andriy Misyaylo (Vorskla Poltava), Mykola Revutskyi (Prykarpattia Ivano-Frankivsk), Vasyl Chornyi (Nyva Ternopil)
 Forwards: Ihor Khudobyak (Prykarpattia Ivano-Frankivsk), Andriy Shevchuk (PFC Sevastopol), Dmytro Hunchenko (Illichivets Mariupol), Matviy Bobal (Tavriya Simferopol)

On 17 August 2018 there first gathered Ukraine national female student football team for the 2019 Universiade preparation. The head coach of the team was appointed the head coach of Ukraine women's national football team Natalya Zinchenko.

Competitive record

Universiade

Last games

Group B

Quarterfinals

5th–8th place semifinals

Fifth place match

Current squad
Squad as of 01 July 2019

Coaching Staff
 Head coach: Anatoliy Buznik
 Assistant: Stepan Yurchyshyn
 Assistant: Oleksiy Yatsenko

Former coaches
 1995 Bezsonov & Volodymyr Lozynskyi
 1997 Anatoliy Konkov
 1999 Viktor Zhylin
 2001 Anatoliy Buznik
 2003 Anatoliy Buznik
 2007 Volodymyr Lozynskyi
 2009 Volodymyr Lozynskyi
 2011 Volodymyr Lozynskyi
 2013 Volodymyr Lozynskyi
 2015 Volodymyr Lozynskyi 
 2017 Anatoliy Buznik
 2019 Anatoliy Buznik

Top scorers
Since 2009
 Anton Kotlyar – 6
 Serhiy Kravchenko – 4
 Alisher Yakubov – 2
 Ihor Kurylo – 2
 Vladyslav Piskun – 2

Achievements
 Football at the Summer Universiade
Winners (2): 2007, 2009 
Runners-up (1): 2001

See also
 Volodymyr Lozynskyi
 Burevestnik (Ukraine), Soviet students sports society

References

External links
Student football at the Football Federation of Ukraine website
 Ukraine student football team at the All-Ukrainian Football Association of Students

 
Ministry of Education (Ukraine)
Amateur sport in Ukraine
Student sport in Ukraine
Amateur association football
Youth football in Ukraine